Margaret Louise Langford (born 18 July 1970 in Vancouver, British Columbia) is a Canadian slalom canoeist who competed from the late 1980s to the mid-2000s (decade). Competing in four Summer Olympics, she earned her best finish of eighth in the K1 event in Atlanta in 1996.

World Cup individual podiums

References

Sports-Reference.com profile

1970 births
Sportspeople from Vancouver
Canadian female canoeists
Canoeists at the 1992 Summer Olympics
Canoeists at the 1996 Summer Olympics
Canoeists at the 2000 Summer Olympics
Canoeists at the 2004 Summer Olympics
Living people
Olympic canoeists of Canada